Sbrosovoye Lake is a small lake  southwest of Tyuleniy Point in the Schirmacher Hills, Queen Maud Land. Mapped by the Soviet Antarctic Expedition in 1961 and named Ozero Sbrosovoye (fault lake).

Lakes of Queen Maud Land
Princess Astrid Coast